Robert A. Freitas Jr. (born 1952) is an American nanotechnologist.

Career
In 1974, Freitas earned a bachelor's degree in both physics and psychology from Harvey Mudd College, and in 1978, he received a Juris Doctor (J.D.) degree from Santa Clara University School of Law. He has written more than 150 technical papers, book chapters, and popular articles on scientific, engineering, and legal topics.

Freitas began writing his Nanomedicine book series in 1994.  Volume I, published in October 1999 by Landes Bioscience while Freitas was a Research Fellow at the Institute for Molecular Manufacturing. Volume IIA was published in October 2003 by Landes Bioscience.

In 2004, Freitas and Ralph Merkle coauthored and published Kinematic Self-Replicating Machines, a comprehensive survey of the field of physical and hypothetical self-replicating machines.

In 2009, Freitas was awarded the Feynman Prize in theoretical nanotechnology.

Bibliography
 Robert A. Freitas Jr., Nanomedicine, Volume I: Basic Capabilities (Landes Bioscience, 1999) 
 Robert A. Freitas Jr., Nanomedicine, Vol. IIA: Biocompatibility (Landes Bioscience, 2003) 
 Robert A. Freitas Jr., Ralph C. Merkle, Kinematic Self-Replicating Machines (Landes Bioscience, 2004) 
 Robert A. Freitas Jr., Nanomedicine: Biocompatibility (S Karger Pub, 2004) 
 Robert A. Freitas Jr., Cryostasis Revival: The Recovery of Cryonics Patients through Nanomedicine (Alcor Life Extension Foundation, 2022)

See also
 Ecophagy

References

External links

 Robert Freitas' personal website

1952 births
Living people
American nanotechnologists
Harvey Mudd College alumni
Santa Clara University alumni
American people of Portuguese descent
American transhumanists
Cryonicists